The Qin bronze chariot (銅車馬 or 秦銅車馬) refers to a set of two Qin dynasty bronze model chariots that were unearthed in 1980 at the Mausoleum of the First Qin Emperor, Qin Shi Huang (reigned  247–220 BCE). When the models were found they were in many broken pieces, and it took five years to restore them both. Both models are about half life-size.

The first piece, "bronze chariot number one" (一號銅車馬), consists of an open chariot drawn by four bronze horses, with a single standing driver and a bronze umbrella on a stand placed next to him.

The second piece, "bronze chariot number two" (二號銅車馬), is a closed carriage with two seats and an umbrella-like roof, which is also drawn by four bronze horses.

The chariots are stored at the Museum of the Terracotta Warriors and Horses of Qin Shi Huang (秦始皇兵馬俑博物館) in Shaanxi. In 2010 the piece was showcased at the Shanghai Expo as an exhibit inside the China Pavilion building.

The chariots are one of sixty-four designated historical artifacts that are prohibited from being exhibited outside China.

See also
 Chariot (Ancient China)
 South-pointing chariot

References

External links

Chinese bronzeware
Chariots
1980 archaeological discoveries
Qin Shi Huang
Archaeological artifacts of China